DeArmanville is an unincorporated community in Calhoun County, Alabama, United States, located on the southeast boundary of Anniston. DeArmanville has a post office with ZIP code 36257.

Climate
The climate in this area is characterized by hot, humid summers and generally mild to cool winters.  According to the Köppen Climate Classification system, DeArmanville has a humid subtropical climate, abbreviated "Cfa" on climate maps.

References

External links

Unincorporated communities in Calhoun County, Alabama
Unincorporated communities in Alabama